Belarus competed at the 2020 Summer Olympics in Tokyo. Originally scheduled to take place from 24 July to 9 August 2020, the Games were postponed to 23 July to 8 August 2021, because of the COVID-19 pandemic. It was the nation's seventh consecutive appearance at the Summer Olympics in the post-Soviet era.

Background

IOC sanctions
For several years, the Belarus Olympic Committee (NOC RB) has been accused of political discrimination in its selection and treatment of athletes. Accusations and athlete tensions came to a head in 2020 after the disputed re-election of Belarusian president Alexander Lukashenko, also the NOC RB chairman at the time, and the widespread protests that followed. The NOC RB was allegedly associated with the torture of athletes who have spoken out against Lukashenko, which the International Olympic Committee (IOC) has been investigating.

Before the Games, the IOC restricted the NOC RB for athletes' rights violations twice (the first in December 2020 and the second in March 2021). The 2020 measures included the banning of all NOC RB officials from Olympic events; the suspension of financial support from the NOC RB; the active involvement of political neutrality for Belarusian athletes; the Belarusian ban from hosting any Olympic events; and the request of all other Olympic members to accept the measures in the interest of the safety of Belarusian athletes. The 2021 measures reiterated the previous set, as well as stating that the IOC did not acknowledge NOC RB officials holding the government positions and requesting that Olympic selection in Belarus proved non-political.

After the second sanctions in March 2021, and the IOC did not recognize the NOC RB leadership election results in the same month, other national committees and sports organizations heeded a plea for Belarus to get banned from the rescheduled Tokyo 2020, forcing the athletes to compete independently under the Olympic flag.

Medalists

Competitors
The following is the list of number of competitors participating in the Games:

Summary

Disqualification of Belarusian athletes
On 28 July 2021, The Athletics Integrity Unit announced that Belarus was one of several countries which had failed to meet the minimum drug testing requirements as per "Rule 15", which requires at least three no-notice outside of competition blood and urine drug tests no less than three weeks apart for three of their athletics competitors. As such, three unnamed athletes were disqualified from participating in their events. It was later revealed that two of these athletes were runners Hanna Mikhailava and Krystsina Muliarchyk.

Removal of Krystsina Tsimanouskaya from Belarusian team

Tsimanouskaya qualified to participate at the Summer Olympics in the 100 m and 200 m events only. After several Belarusian athletes were disqualified due to not meeting the minimum drug testing requirements, national sport authorities entered her into the 4 × 400 m relay in addition to her planned events. Tsimanouskaya claimed that this decision was made without her consent and criticized the national sport authorities publicly on her Instagram account. On 1 August 2021, she was allegedly taken to Haneda Airport forcibly by the Belarus Olympic Committee. She refused to board a flight back to Belarus, and asked both the International Olympic Committee and Japan for assistance.

Archery

Three Belarusian archers qualified for the women's events by reaching the quarterfinal stage of the women's team recurve at the 2019 World Archery Championships in 's-Hertogenbosch, Netherlands.

Artistic swimming

Belarus fielded a squad of two artistic swimmers to compete in the women's duet event, by winning the bronze medal at the 2021 FINA Olympic Qualification Tournament in Barcelona, Spain.

Athletics

Belarusian athletes further achieved the entry standards, either by qualifying time or by world ranking, in the following track and field events (up to a maximum of 3 athletes in each event):

Belarusian athletes were scheduled to participate in the women's 4 × 400 metres relay. On July 28, two athletes, Hanna Mikhailava and Krystsina Muliarchyk, were declared ineligible due to insufficient number of doping tests made. This situation forced Belarusian sport authorities to replace them. Sprinter Krystsina Tsimanouskaya (100 m and 200 m) was chosen to be one of the substitutes; however, she claimed that this decision was made without her consent and criticized the national sport authorities.

On 1 August 2021, Tsimanouskaya was expelled from further competitions by the national sports authorities, reportedly as a consequence of her criticism. On the same day, the Belarusian sports officials tried to put her on a plane against her will. She sought the protection of police in Tokyo airport and declared that she was not planning to return to Belarus. According to the national athletics team officials, she was expelled for her "emotional and psychological state" after medical examination, but Tsimanouskaya denied that statement. She asked the International Olympic Committee for help.

The four athletes who eventually contested the event  Aliaksandra Khilmanovich, Yuliya Bliznets, Elvira Herman and Asteria Uzo Limai  came last of all nations in the heats and did not advance.

Track & road events
Men

Women

Field events
Men

Women

Combined events – Men's decathlon

Boxing

Belarus entered four male boxers into the Olympic tournament. Dzmitry Asanau scored a round-of-16 victory to secure a spot in the men's lightweight division at the 2020 European Qualification Tournament in Villebon-sur-Yvette, France.

Canoeing

Sprint
Belarusian canoeists qualified a total of eight boats in each of the following distances for the Games through the 2019 ICF Canoe Sprint World Championships in Szeged, Hungary.

Men

Women

Qualification Legend: FA = Qualify to final (medal); FB = Qualify to final B (non-medal); SF = Qualify to semifinal round; QF = Qualify to quarterfinal round

Cycling

Road
Belarus entered one rider each to compete in the men's and women's Olympic road races, by virtue of his top 50 national finish (for men) and her top 22 (for women) in the UCI World Ranking.

Track
Following the completion of the 2020 UCI Track Cycling World Championships, Belarus entered two riders to compete each in the men's and women's omnium, respectively, based on their final individual UCI Olympic rankings.

Omnium

Equestrian

Belarus entered two eventing riders into the Olympic equestrian competition by securing the second and third of six available slots, respectively, outside the group and continental selection, in the individual FEI Olympic rankings. MeanwhIle, one dressage rider was added to the Belarusian roster by finishing in the top two, outside the group selection, of the individual FEI Olympic rankings for Group C (Central and Eastern Europe). Belarus later withdrew from competing in dressage.

Belarusian individuals for eventing were named on June 30, 2021. Aliaksandr Faminou and Martinie withdrew before the competition began.

Eventing

Gymnastics

Artistic
Belarus initially entered two artistic gymnasts into the Olympic competition. Anastasiya Alistratava booked a spot in the women's individual all-around and apparatus events, by finishing fifteenth out of the twenty gymnasts eligible for qualification at the 2019 World Championships in Stuttgart, Germany. On the men's side, Rio 2016 Olympian Andrey Likhovitskiy received a spare berth from the apparatus events, as one of the seven highest-ranked gymnasts, neither part of the team nor qualified directly through the all-around, at the same tournament. Alistratava withdrew in July 2021, and her spot was given to teammate Hanna Traukova. Likhovitskiy also withdrew; however, his spot was given to Czech gymnast David Jessen.

Women

Rhythmic 
Belarus qualified a squad of rhythmic gymnasts for the individual and group all-around by finishing in the top 16 (for individual) and top 5 (for group), respectively, at the 2019 World Championships in Baku. The athletes for both the individual and group all-around were announced on 23 June 2021.

Trampoline
Belarus qualified one gymnast for the men's trampoline by finishing in the top eight at the 2019 World Championships in Tokyo, Japan. An additional spot was earned through the 2019-2020 Trampoline World Cup series.

Judo
 
Belarus entered two judoka (one men and one women) into the Olympic tournament based on the International Judo Federation Olympics Individual Ranking.

Modern pentathlon

Belarusian athletes qualified for the following spots to compete in modern pentathlon. Iryna Prasiantsova secured her selection in the women's race by winning the bronze medal and finishing second among those eligible for Olympic qualification at the 2019 European Championships in Bath, England. She was joined by her fellow rookie Volha Silkina, who booked her place with a gold-medal victory at the 2019 UIPM World Championships in Budapest, Hungary. Iryna Prasiantsova doesn't participate because only 2 quotas for NOC are available.

Rowing

Belarus qualified three boats for each of the following rowing classes into the Olympic regatta. Rowing crews in the men's pair and women's lightweight double sculls confirmed Olympic places for their boats at the 2019 FISA World Championships in Ottensheim, Austria. Another Belarusian rower scored a runner-up finish to book one of the remaining boats available in the women's single sculls at the 2021 FISA Final Qualification Regatta in Lucerne, Switzerland.

Qualification Legend: FA=Final A (medal); FB=Final B (non-medal); FC=Final C (non-medal); FD=Final D (non-medal); FE=Final E (non-medal); FF=Final F (non-medal); SA/B=Semifinals A/B; SC/D=Semifinals C/D; SE/F=Semifinals E/F; QF=Quarterfinals; R=Repechage

Sailing

Belarusian sailors qualified one boat in each of the following classes through the class-associated World Championships, and the continental regattas.

M = Medal race; EL = Eliminated – did not advance into the medal race

Shooting

Belarusian shooters achieved quota places for the following events by virtue of their best finishes at the 2018 ISSF World Championships, the 2019 ISSF World Cup series, European Championships or Games, and European Qualifying Tournament, as long as they obtained a minimum qualifying score (MQS) by 6 June 2021.

Set to compete at her sixth consecutive Games, Viktoria Chaika earned a direct place in the women's 10 m air pistol as the highest-ranked shooter vying for qualification in the ISSF World Olympic Rankings of 6 June 2021.

Swimming

Belarusian swimmers further achieved qualifying standards in the following events (up to a maximum of 2 swimmers in each event at the Olympic Qualifying Time (OQT), and potentially 1 at the Olympic Selection Time (OST)):

Men

Women

Mixed

Tennis

Weightlifting

Belarusian weightlifters qualified for two quota places at the games, based on the Tokyo 2020 Rankings Qualification List of 11 June 2021.

Wrestling

Belarus qualified eight wrestlers for each of the following classes into the Olympic competition. Two of them finished among the top six to book Olympic spots in the men's Greco-Roman 87 kg and women's freestyle 57 kg at the 2019 World Championships, while five additional licenses were awarded to the Belarusian wrestlers, who progressed to the top two finals of their respective weight categories at the 2021 European Olympic Qualification Tournament in Budapest, Hungary. Another Belarusian wrestler claimed one of the remaining slots in the men's freestyle 74 kg to complete the nation's roster at the 2021 World Qualification Tournament in Sofia, Bulgaria.

Freestyle

Greco-Roman

See also
 Belarus at the 2020 Summer Paralympics

References

External links 

Nations at the 2020 Summer Olympics
2020
2021 in Belarusian sport